Kevin Hart: Don't F**k This Up is a 2019 documentary streaming television series starring Kevin Hart. The premise revolves around Kevin Hart and his journey to the point of his Oscar scandal in 2018 and the controversy surrounding it.

Cast 
 Kevin Hart

Episodes

Season 1 (2019)

Release 
Kevin Hart: Don't F**k This Up was released on December 27, 2019, on Netflix.

Accolades

References

External links
 
 

2019 American television series debuts
2010s American documentary television series
English-language Netflix original programming
Netflix original documentary television series
Television series by Lionsgate Television
Television series by 3 Arts Entertainment
Television series by Magical Elves